Sithembiso Gile Gladys Nyoni (born 20 September 1949) is a Zimbabwean politician and a former Minister of Small and Medium Enterprises Development. She is the incumbent minister of Women and Youth Affairs.

Political career
In the March 2008 parliamentary election, Nyoni was elected to the House of Assembly as the ZANU-PF candidate in Nkayi North. She received 4,634 votes against 4,234 for Moyo Talent of the Movement for Democratic Change (MDC)-Mutambara faction and 1,075 for Mlilo Thembinkosi of the MDC-Tsvangirai faction.

The Herald reported on January 3, 2009, that Nyoni had been dismissed from the Cabinet earlier in the week, along with 11 other ministers, because she no longer held any seat in Parliament.
On 1 December 2017 President Emmerson Mnangagwa elected a new Cabinet, Cde Sithembiso Nyoni became the new Minister of Women and Youth Affairs.

She was on the United States sanctions list from 2003 until 2014.

References 

20th-century births
Year of birth missing (living people)
Place of birth missing (living people)
Living people
Members of the National Assembly of Zimbabwe
ZANU–PF politicians 
Women government ministers of Zimbabwe
Women's ministers of Zimbabwe
21st-century Zimbabwean women politicians
21st-century Zimbabwean politicians